Thisanotia is a monotypic moth genus of the family Crambidae described by Jacob Hübner in 1825. Its single species, Thisanotia chrysonuchella, described by Giovanni Antonio Scopoli in his 1763 Entomologia Carniolica, is found in Europe.

The wingspan is 24–34 mm. The forewings are ferruginous- brown, clearly irrorated with black; veins and costal edge marked with rather undefined white streaks; median line thick, obtusely angulated, ferruginous-brown; second white, anteriorly edged with ferruginous-brown, rounded -angulated; termen ferruginous- yellow, with some indistinct black dots; cilia metallic. The hindwings are grey. 

The moth flies in one generation from May to June..

The larvae feed on various grasses such as Festuca ovina.

Subspecies
Thisanotia chrysonuchella chrysonuchella
Thisanotia chrysonuchella dilutalis (Caradja, 1916)

Notes
The flight season refers to Belgium and the Netherlands. This may vary in other parts of the range.

References

External links
Microlepidoptera.nl 
Lepidoptera of Belgium
Thisanotia chrysonuchella at UKMoths

Crambinae
Crambidae genera
Moths of Europe
Insects of Turkey
Monotypic moth genera
Taxa named by Jacob Hübner